was a Japanese photographer from Tokyo. He was the grandson of Takamura Koun.

Takamura photographed fashion and architecture.

References

1933 births
2014 deaths
Japanese photographers